Elijah ben Solomon Abraham ha-Kohen (died 1729) was dayyan of Smyrna, almoner and preacher.

Works 
 Midrash Eliyahu, eleven funeral sermons and a commentary on the Talmudic sayings relative to the Book of Esther (Constantinople, 1693)
 Midrash ha-Izmiri, homilies (ib. 1695)
 Midrash Talpiyyot, glosses and comments taken from 300 works and containing 926 (the numerical value of the word "Talpiyyot") paragraphs in alphabetical order: only the first part, from "alef" to "kaf," was published (Amsterdam, 1698)
 Me'il Ẓedaḳah, a treatise on charity (ib. 1704)
 Shebeṭ Musar, on ethics, the best known of his works, divided into fifty-two chapters corresponding to the weeks of the year, and taken for the most part from the Or Ḳadmon of Moses Ḥagis, the Tokaḥot of the Spanish poets, the Orḥot Ḥayyim, and the Roḳeaḥ of Eleazar of Worms (Constantinople, 1712)
 Megalleh Ẓefunot, kabalistic treatises (Porizk, 1785)
 She'elot u-Teshubot, responsa (Sudilkov, 1796)
 Minḥat Eliyahu, sermons (Salonica, 1824)
 Semukim le-'Ad, homiletic treatise on the parashiyyot (ib. 1826)
 We-Lo 'Od Ella, a treatise on the Talmudic and Midrashic passages beginning with these words (Smyrna, 1853).

Elijah's other works are not yet published (as of 1906). They include:
 a commentary to the Psalms
 Ezor Eliyahu, a commentary to Abot and to the Pesaḥ Haggadah
 Ṭa'ame ha-Miẓwot, a treatise on the 613 commandments
 Sheloshah Mahadurot, a commentary to the Pentateuch
 Shiṭṭah, on the Abodah Zarah
 a commentary to the difficult passages in the Ta'anit
 a commentary to the Hafṭarot
 Ḥiddushim Nifradim, Yado ha-Kol, comprising commentaries to the Song of Songs, Book of Ruth, and Book of Esther, each under a different title
 mystical glosses to the Song of Songs and Esther
 a commentary to Lamentations
 commentaries to Pirḳe Rabbi Eliezer, Otiyyot de-Rabbi Aḳiba, Kallah, Semaḥot, Derek Ereẓ Rabbah and Derek Ereẓ Zuṭa, Tanna debe Eliyahu, and Tiḳḳune ha-'Aberot
 one treatise and three sermons on repentance
 a commentary to various prayers
 a commentary to the Aggadah of the Jerusalem Talmud

Jewish Encyclopedia bibliography 
Azulai, Shem ha-Gedolim, i. 22;
Michael, Or ha-Ḥayyim, No. 407:
Jellinek, B. H. i. 16, Preface;
Steinschneider, Cat. Bodl. col. 932;
Fürst, Bibl. Jud. i. 238;
Friedenstein, 'Ir Gibborim.

References

External links 
Jewish Encyclopedia article on Elijah ben Solomon Abraham ha-Kohen, by Kaufmann Kohler and   M. Seligsohn.

1729 deaths
Smyrniote Jews
Kohanim writers of Rabbinic literature
18th-century rabbis from the Ottoman Empire
Year of birth unknown